Janne Blomqvist (born 6 May 1972) is a retired freestyle sprint swimmer from Finland. Blomqvist was born in Helsinki, and competed for his native country at two consecutive Summer Olympics, starting in 1992 in Barcelona, Spain. His best result was a 12th place with the men's 4×100 metres freestyle relay team at the 1996 Summer Olympics, alongside Jani Sievinen, Antti Kasvio, and Kalle Varonen.

References
Profile

1972 births
Living people
Finnish male freestyle swimmers
Swimmers at the 1992 Summer Olympics
Swimmers at the 1996 Summer Olympics
Olympic swimmers of Finland
Swimmers from Helsinki